The year 2017 is the 24th year in the history of the K-1. 2016 starts with K-1 World GP 2017 -62.5kg Japan Tournament.

List of events

K-1 World GP 2017 Lightweight Championship Tournament

{| class="wikitable" style="font-size: 80%;"
|-
! colspan="8" style="background-color: #ccf; color: #000080; text-align: center;" | Fight Card
|-
! colspan="1" style="background-color: #E6E8FA; color: #000000; text-align: center;" | Weight Class
! colspan="1" style="background-color: #E6E8FA; color: #000000; text-align: center;" | 
! colspan="1" style="background-color: #E6E8FA; color: #000000; text-align: center;" | 
! colspan="1" style="background-color: #E6E8FA; color: #000000; text-align: center;" | 
! colspan="1" style="background-color: #E6E8FA; color: #000000; text-align: center;" | Method
! colspan="1" style="background-color: #E6E8FA; color: #000000; text-align: center;" | Round  
! colspan="1" style="background-color: #E6E8FA; color: #000000; text-align: center;" | Time
! colspan="1" style="background-color: #E6E8FA; color: #000000; text-align: center;" | Notes
|-
|Lightweight 62.5kg
| Wei Rui
|align=center|def.
| Ren Hiramoto
|Decision (split)
|align=center|3
|align=center|3:00
|Lightweight GP Final
|-
|-
|Super Featherweight 60kg
| Taiga
|align=center|def.
| Hirotaka Urabe
|Decision (unanimous)
|align=center|3
|align=center|3:00
|For the K-1 Super Featherweight Championship
|-
|-
|Super Welterweight 70kg
| Hinata
|align=center|def.
| Shintaro Matsukura
|Decision (unanimous)
|align=center|3
|align=center|3:00
|
|-
|-
|Lightweight 62.5kg
| Wei Rui
|align=center|def.
| Cristian Spetcu
|Decision (unanimous)
|align=center|3
|align=center|3:00
|Lightweight GP Semi-final
|-
|-
|Lightweight 62.5kg
| Ren Hiramoto
|align=center|def.
| Gonnapar Weerasakreck
|KO (Left Cross)
|align=center|1
|align=center|1:14
|Lightweight GP Semi-final
|-
|-
|Super Lightweight 65kg
| Masaaki Noiri
|align=center|def.
| Younes Smaili
|Decision (unanimous)
|align=center|3
|align=center|3:00
|
|-
|-
|Heavyweight 100kg
| Ibrahim El Bouni
|align=center|def.
| Makoto Uehara
|KO (Left hook)
|align=center|2
|align=center|1:33
|
|-
|-
|Lightweight 62.5kg
| Cristian Spetcu
|align=center|def.
| Toshiki Taniyama
|Decision (unanimous)
|align=center|3
|align=center|3:00
|Lightweight GP Quarter-final
|-
|-
|Lightweight 62.5kg
| Wei Rui
|align=center|def.
| Daizo Sasaki
|KO (Left Hook)
|align=center|2
|align=center|1:04
|Lightweight GP Quarter-final
|-
|-
|Lightweight 62.5kg
| Gonnapar Weerasakreck
|align=center|def.
| Koya Urabe
|Decision (unanimous)
|align=center|3
|align=center|3:00
|Lightweight GP Quarter-final
|-
|-
|Lightweight 62.5kg
| Ren Hiramoto
|align=center|def.
| Brice Delval
|Decision (majority)
|align=center|3
|align=center|3:00
|Lightweight GP Quarter-final
|-
|-
|Lightweight 62.5kg
| Rukiya Anpo
|align=center|def.
| Hiroshi Mizumashi
|KO (Jumping Switch kick)
|align=center|2
|align=center|0:06
|Lightweight GP Reserve
|-
! colspan="8" style="background-color: #ccf; color: #000080; text-align: center;" | Preliminary Card
|-
|Super Welterweight 70 kg
| Katsuya Jinbo
|align=center|def.
| Taketo
|KO (body punch)
|align=center|1
|align=center|2:06
|
|-
|-
|Super Lightweight 65 kg
| Atsuto Matsumoto
|align=center|vs.
| Kensei Kondo
|Draw
|align=center|3
|align=center|3:00
|
|-
|-
|Super Bantamweight 55 kg
| Hiroto Ishizuka
|align=center|def.
| Yuta Kuwata
|Decision (unanimous)
|align=center|3
|align=center|3:00
|
|-

62.5kg GP Championship

K-1 World GP 2017: Super Bantamweight Tournament

{| class="wikitable" style="font-size: 80%;"
|-
! colspan="8" style="background-color: #ccf; color: #000080; text-align: center;" | Fight Card
|-
! colspan="1" style="background-color: #E6E8FA; color: #000000; text-align: center;" | Weight Class
! colspan="1" style="background-color: #E6E8FA; color: #000000; text-align: center;" | 
! colspan="1" style="background-color: #E6E8FA; color: #000000; text-align: center;" | 
! colspan="1" style="background-color: #E6E8FA; color: #000000; text-align: center;" | 
! colspan="1" style="background-color: #E6E8FA; color: #000000; text-align: center;" | Method
! colspan="1" style="background-color: #E6E8FA; color: #000000; text-align: center;" | Round  
! colspan="1" style="background-color: #E6E8FA; color: #000000; text-align: center;" | Time
! colspan="1" style="background-color: #E6E8FA; color: #000000; text-align: center;" | Notes
|-
|Super Bantamweight 55kg
| Yoshiki Takei
|align=center|def.
| Kenji Kubo
|Decision (unanimous)
|align=center|3
|align=center|3:00
|Super Bantamweight GP Final
|-
|-
|Super Lightweight 65kg
| Kaew Fairtex
|align=center|def.
| Hideaki Yamazaki
|Decision (unanimous)
|align=center|3
|align=center|3:00
|For the K-1 Super Lightweight Championship
|-
|-
|Featherweight 57.5 kg
| Takeru Segawa
|align=center|def.
| Victor Saravia
|KO
|align=center|3
|align=center|2:23
|
|-
|-
|Suprr Bantamweight 57.5kg
| Kenji Kubo
|align=center|def.
| Nobuchika Terado
|KO
|align=center|2
|align=center|3:00
|Super Bantamweight GP Semi-final
|-
|-
|Super Bantamweight 57.5kg
| Yoshiki Takei
|align=center|def.
| Keisuke Ishida
|KO 
|align=center|1
|align=center|1:32
|Super Bantamweight GP Semi-final
|-
|-
|Super Lightweight 65kg
| Tetsuya Yamato
|align=center|def.
| Hiroya
|KO
|align=center|2
|align=center|0:58
|
|-
|-
|Heavyweight 100kg
| Koichi
|align=center|def.
| K-Jee
|KO 
|align=center|3
|align=center|0:38
|
|-
|-
|Super Bantamweight 55kg
| Kenji Kubo
|align=center|def.
| Son Dachen
|Decision (unanimous)
|align=center|3
|align=center|3:00
|Super Bantamweight GP Quarter-final
|-
|-
|Super Bantamweight 55kg
| Nobuchika Terado
|align=center|def.
| Jamie Whelan
|Decision (split)
|align=center|3
|align=center|3
|Super Bantamweight GP Quarter-final
|-
|-
|Super Bantamweight 55kg
| Yoshiki Takei
|align=center|def.
| Antonio Orden
|KO
|align=center|3
|align=center|2:31
|Super Bantamweight GP Quarter-final
|-
|-
|Super Bantamweight 55kg
| Keisuke Ishida
|align=center|def.
| Charles Bongiovanni
|KO
|align=center|2
|align=center|1:43
|Super Bantamweight GP Quarter-final
|-
|-
|Super Bantamweight 55kg
| Namito Izawa
|align=center|def.
| Yuya Suzuki
|Decision (split)
|align=center|3
|align=center|3:00
|Super Bantamweight GP Reserve
|-
|-
! colspan="8" style="background-color: #ccf; color: #000080; text-align: center;" | Preliminary Card
|-
|-
|Super Welterweight 70 kg
| Hiromi Wajima
|align=center|def.
| Kazunari Kimura
|TKO 
|align=center|1
|align=center|1:13
|
|-
|-
|Lightweight 62.5 kg
| Seiya Ueda
|align=center|vs.
| Masaru
|Decision (unanimous)
|align=center|3
|align=center|3:00
|
|-
|-
|Super Featherweight 60 kg
| Yuma Saikyo
|align=center|def.
| Hiroki Kokubo
|KO
|align=center|1
|align=center|2:48
|
|-

55 kg GP Championship

K-1 World GP 2017 Super Welterweight Championship Tournament

{| class="wikitable" style="font-size: 80%;"
|-
! colspan="8" style="background-color: #ccf; color: #000080; text-align: center;" | Fight Card
|-
! colspan="1" style="background-color: #E6E8FA; color: #000000; text-align: center;" | Weight Class
! colspan="1" style="background-color: #E6E8FA; color: #000000; text-align: center;" | 
! colspan="1" style="background-color: #E6E8FA; color: #000000; text-align: center;" | 
! colspan="1" style="background-color: #E6E8FA; color: #000000; text-align: center;" | 
! colspan="1" style="background-color: #E6E8FA; color: #000000; text-align: center;" | Method
! colspan="1" style="background-color: #E6E8FA; color: #000000; text-align: center;" | Round  
! colspan="1" style="background-color: #E6E8FA; color: #000000; text-align: center;" | Time
! colspan="1" style="background-color: #E6E8FA; color: #000000; text-align: center;" | Notes
|-
|-
|Super Welterweight 70kg
| Chingiz Allazov 
|align=center|def.
| Yasuhiro Kido 
|Decision (Unanimous)
|align=center|3
|align=center|3:00
|Super Welterweight GP Final
|-
|-
|Super Lightweight 65kg
| Masaaki Noiri 
|align=center|def.
| Kaew Fairtex (c)
|Ext.R Decision (Split)
|align=center|4
|align=center|3:00
|Super Lightweight Championship Match
|-
|Lightweight 62.5kg
| Wei Rui (c)
|align=center|def.
| Gonnapar Weerasakreck
|Decision (Majority)
|align=center|3
|align=center|3:00
|Lightweight Championship Match
|-
|Featherweight 57.5kg
| Takeru 
|align=center|def.
| Buvaisar Paskhaev
|KO (Left Hook to the Body)
|align=center|3
|align=center|1:17
| 
|-
|Super Welterweight 70kg
| Chingiz Allazov 
|align=center|def.
| Jordann Pikeur 
|KO (Right Hook)
|align=center|1
|align=center|2:17
|Super Welterweight GP Semi-final
|-
|-
|Super Welterweight 70kg
| Yasuhiro Kido 
|align=center|def.
| Sanny Dahlbeck 
|KO (Low Kicks)
|align=center|1
|align=center|2:28
|Super Welterweight GP Semi-final
|-
|-
|Super Featherweight 60kg
| Taiga 
|align=center|def.
| Koji
|Decision (Unanimous)
|align=center|3
|align=center|3:00
| 
|-|-
|Featherweight 57.5kg
| Haruma Saikyo 
|align=center|def.
| Kaito Ozawa
|Decision (Unanimous)
|align=center|3
|align=center|3:00
| 
|-|-
|Super Lightweight 65kg
| Ren Hiramoto 
|align=center|def.
| Umar Paskhaev
|Decision (Unanimous)
|align=center|3
|align=center|3:00
| 
|-
|Super Welterweight 70kg
| Jordann Pikeur 
|align=center|def.
| Hinata 
|Decision (Unanimous)
|align=center|3
|align=center|3:00
|Super Welterweight GP Quarter-final
|-
|-
|Super Welterweight 70kg
| Chingiz Allazov 
|align=center|def.
| Hiroki Nakajima 
|KO (2 Knockdowns)
|align=center|2
|align=center|1:18
|Super Welterweight GP Quarter-final
|-
|-
|Super Welterweight 70kg
| Sanny Dahlbeck 
|align=center|def.
| Yu Hirono
|TKO (Doctor Stoppage)
|align=center|2
|align=center|2:33
|Super Welterweight GP Quarter-final
|-
|-
|Super Welterweight 70kg
| Yasuhiro Kido 
|align=center|def.
| Luke Whelan 
|KO (Left Middle Kick)
|align=center|3
|align=center|1:34
|Super Welterweight GP Quarter-final
|-
|-
|Super Welterweight 70kg
| Yoichi Yamazaki 
|align=center|def.
| Tomoaki Makino 
|Decision (Unanimous)
|align=center|3
|align=center|3:00
|Super Welterweight GP Reserve Fight
|-
! colspan="8" style="background-color: #ccf; color: #000080; text-align: center;" | Preliminary Card
|-
|Super Weleterweight 70kg
| Katsuya Jinbo 
|align=center|def.
| Masato Uchiyama
|KO (Right Cross)
|align=center|1
|align=center|2:21
| 
|-
|Lightweight 62.5kg
| Yuki Takeuchi 
|align=center|def.
| Ryo Tabata
|KO (Right Cross)
|align=center|1
|align=center|0:31
| 
|-|-
|Super Lightweight 65kg
| Hayato Suzuki 
|align=center|def.
| Yuki Koge
|KO (Left Cross)
|align=center|2
|align=center|1:02
| 
|-|-
|Super Featherweight 60kg
| Yuma Saikyo 
|align=center|def.
| Takuma Kawaguchi
|Decision (Unanimous)
|align=center|3
|align=center|3:00
| 
|-

70 kg GP Championship

K-1 World GP 2017 Welterweight Championship Tournament

{| class="wikitable" style="font-size: 80%;"
|-
! colspan="8" style="background-color: #ccf; color: #000080; text-align: center;" | Fight Card
|-
! colspan="1" style="background-color: #E6E8FA; color: #000000; text-align: center;" | Weight Class
! colspan="1" style="background-color: #E6E8FA; color: #000000; text-align: center;" | 
! colspan="1" style="background-color: #E6E8FA; color: #000000; text-align: center;" | 
! colspan="1" style="background-color: #E6E8FA; color: #000000; text-align: center;" | 
! colspan="1" style="background-color: #E6E8FA; color: #000000; text-align: center;" | Method
! colspan="1" style="background-color: #E6E8FA; color: #000000; text-align: center;" | Round  
! colspan="1" style="background-color: #E6E8FA; color: #000000; text-align: center;" | Time
! colspan="1" style="background-color: #E6E8FA; color: #000000; text-align: center;" | Notes
|-
|-
|Welterweight 67.5kg
| Yuta Kubo
|align=center|def.
| Mohan Dragon
|Decision (Unanimous)
|align=center|3
|align=center|3:00
|Welterweight Tournament Final
|-
|Featherweight 57.5kg
| Takeru (c)
|align=center|def.
| Wang Junguang
|Decision (Unanimous)
|align=center|3
|align=center|3:00
| K-1 World GP Featherweight Title Match
|-
|Super Featherweight 60kg
| Stavros Exakoustidis
|align=center|def.
| Taiga
|KO (Left Hook)
|align=center|1
|align=center|2:41
| 
|-
|Super Bantamweight 55kg
| Yoshiki Takei 
|align=center|def.
| Namito Izawa
|KO (Punches)
|align=center|3
|align=center|1:10
|-
|-
|Welterweight 67.5kg
| Yuta Kubo
|align=center|def.
| Hitoshi Tsukakoshi
|KO (Low Kicks)
|align=center|2
|align=center|2:36
|Welterweight Tournament Semi-finals
|-
|Welterweight 67.5kg
| Mohan Dragon
|align=center|def.
| Kazuki Yamagiwa
|KO (Left Cross)
|align=center|2
|align=center|2:58
|Welterweight Tournament Semi-finals
|-
|Super Featherweight 60kg
| Hirotaka Urabe 
|align=center|def.
| Masahiro Yamamoto
|KO (Right Cross)
|align=center|2
|align=center|2:51
| 
|-
|Super Welterweight 70kg
| Hinata 
|align=center|def.
| Sergio Sanchez
|Decision (Unanimous)
|align=center|3
|align=center|3:00
| 
|-
|Super Featherweight 60kg
| Koji
|align=center|def.
| Kotaro Shimano
|Decision (Unanimous)
|align=center|3
|align=center|3:00
| 
|-
|Welterweight 67.5kg
| Yuta Kubo
|align=center|def.
| Minoru Kimura
|Decision (Unanimous)
|align=center|3
|align=center|3:00
|Welterweight Tournament Quarter-finals
|-
|Welterweight 67.5kg
| Hitoshi Tsukakoshi
|align=center|def.
| Han Wenbao
|Decision (Unanimous)
|align=center|3
|align=center|3:00
|Welterweight Tournament Quarter-finals
|-
|Welterweight 67.5kg
| Melsik Baghdasaryan
|align=center|def.
| Kazuki Yamagiwa
|Decision (Unanimous)
|align=center|3
|align=center|3:00
|Welterweight Tournament Quarter-finals
|-
|-
|Welterweight 67.5kg
| Mohan Dragon
|align=center|def.
| Daiki Watabe
|TKO (2 Knockdowns)
|align=center|1
|align=center|2:15
| Welterweight Tournament Quarter-finals
|-
|-
|-
|Welterweight 67.5kg
| Keita Makihira
|align=center|def.
| Kenji
|TKO (Doctor Stoppage)
|align=center|3
|align=center|1:06
| Welterweight Tournament Reserve Fight
|-
! colspan="8" style="background-color: #ccf; color: #000080; text-align: center;" | Preliminary Card
|-
|Super Lightweight 65kg
| Junpei Sano
|align=center|def.
| Ryu Nakarai
|Decision (Unanimous)
|align=center|3
|align=center|2:00
|K-1 College 2017 -65kg Final
|-
|-
|Super Featherweight 60kg
| Michitaka Uchida
|align=center|def.
| Ryo Shimoji
|Decision (Unanimous)
|align=center|3
|align=center|2:00
|K-1 College 2017 -60kg Final
|-
|-
|Super Bantamweight 55kg
| Yu Nomura
|align=center|def.
| Seiya Kanazuka
|Decision (Unanimous)
|align=center|3
|align=center|2:00
|K-1 College 2017 -55kg Final
|-

|-
|Welterweight 67.5kg
| Jin Hirayama
|align=center|def.
| Toshiki Watanabe
|KO (Right Cross)
|align=center|1
|align=center|0:44
|
|-
|-
|Heavyweight 100kg
| Taichi Furuta
|align=center|def.
| NORI
|Decision (Majority)
|align=center|3
|align=center|3:00
|
|-

70 kg GP Championship

K-1 World GP 2017 Japan Heavyweight Championship Tournament

{| class="wikitable" style="font-size: 80%;"
|-
! colspan="8" style="background-color: #ccf; color: #000080; text-align: center;" | Fight Card
|-
! colspan="1" style="background-color: #E6E8FA; color: #000000; text-align: center;" | Weight Class
! colspan="1" style="background-color: #E6E8FA; color: #000000; text-align: center;" | 
! colspan="1" style="background-color: #E6E8FA; color: #000000; text-align: center;" | 
! colspan="1" style="background-color: #E6E8FA; color: #000000; text-align: center;" | 
! colspan="1" style="background-color: #E6E8FA; color: #000000; text-align: center;" | Method
! colspan="1" style="background-color: #E6E8FA; color: #000000; text-align: center;" | Round  
! colspan="1" style="background-color: #E6E8FA; color: #000000; text-align: center;" | Time
! colspan="1" style="background-color: #E6E8FA; color: #000000; text-align: center;" | Notes
|-
|-
|Heavyweight 100kg
| Antonio Plazibat
|align=center|def.
| Ibrahim El Bouni
|Decision (Unanimous)
|align=center|3
|align=center|3:00
|Heavyweight Tournament Final
|-
|Super Bantamweight 55kg
| Yoshiki Takei
|align=center|def.
| Victor Saravia
|KO (Body Shots)
|align=center|1
|align=center|1:38
|
|-
|-
|Welterweight 67.5kg
| Minoru Kimura
|align=center|def.
| Yasuhiro Kido
|Decision (Unanimous)
|align=center|3
|align=center|3:00
|
|-
|-
|Lightweight 62.5kg
| Koya Urabe
|align=center|def.
| Cristian Spetcu
|Decision (Unanimous)
|align=center|3
|align=center|3:00
|
|-
|Heavyweight 100kg
| Ibrahim El Bouni
|align=center|def.
| Roel Mannaart
|TKO (2 Knockdowns)
|align=center|1
|align=center|3:00
|Heavyweight Tournament Semi-finals
|-
|-
|Heavyweight 100kg
| Antonio Plazibat
|align=center|def.
| Makoto Uehara
|KO (Jumping Knee)
|align=center|1
|align=center|2:09
|Heavyweight Tournament Semi-finals
|-
|-
|Super Lightweight 65kg
| Ren Hiramoto
|align=center|def.
| Daizo Sasaki
|Decision (Unanimous)
|align=center|3
|align=center|3:00
|
|-
|-
|Super Featherweight 60kg
| Kosuke Komiyama
|align=center|def.
| Stavros Exakoustidis
|Decision (Majority)
|align=center|3
|align=center|3:00
|
|-
|-
|Super Lightweight 65kg
| Tetsuya Yamato
|align=center|def.
| Jun Nakazawa
|KO (Left Hook)
|align=center|1
|align=center|2:24
|
|-
|-
|Heavyweight 100kg
| Ibrahim El Bouni
|align=center|def.
| Koichi
|KO (Left Hook)
|align=center|1
|align=center|0:20
|Heavyweight Tournament Quarter-finals
|-
|Heavyweight 100kg
| Roel Mannaart
|align=center|def.
| Masahiro Iwashita
|TKO (2 Knockdowns)
|align=center|1
|align=center|2:47
|Heavyweight Tournament Quarter-finals
|-
|Heavyweight 100kg
| Antonio Plazibat
|align=center|def.
| K-Jee
|KO (Left Hook to the Body)
|align=center|1
|align=center|1:40
|Heavyweight Tournament Quarter-finals
|-
|-
|Heavyweight 100kg
| Makoto Uehara
|align=center|def.
| Pacome Assi
|KO (Punches)
|align=center|1
|align=center|2:40
|Heavyweight Tournament Quarter-finals
|-
|-
|Heavyweight 100kg
| Ryo Aitaka
|align=center|def.
| Taichi Furuta
|TKO (2 Knockdowns/Right Overhand)
|align=center|1
|align=center|2:17
| Heavyweight Tournament Reserve Fight
|-
! colspan="8" style="background-color: #ccf; color: #000080; text-align: center;" | Preliminary Card
|-
|Super Lightweight 65kg
| Kaisei Kondo
|align=center|def.
| Ruku
|KO (Left High Kick)
|align=center|3
|align=center|0:16
|K-1 Koshien 2017 -65kg Final
|-
|-
|Super Featherweight 60kg
| Shoki Kaneda
|align=center|def.
| Tomoya Yokoyama
|Decision (Unanimous)
|align=center|3
|align=center|2:00
|K-1 Koshien 2017 -60kg Final
|-
|-
|Super Bantamweight 55kg
| Tatsuya Tsubakihara
|align=center|def.
| Itsuki Kobori
|Decision (Unanimous)
|align=center|3
|align=center|2:00
|K-1 Koshien 2017 -55kg Final
|-

|-
|Super Featherweight 60kg
| Naoki Yamamoto
|align=center|def.
| Hayato
|Decision (unanimous)
|align=center|3
|align=center|3:00
|
|-
|-
|Lightweight 62.5kg
| Shota Hara
|align=center|def.
| Yuto Maeda
|Decision (unanimous)
|align=center|3
|align=center|3:00
|
|-

Heavyweight GP Championship

K-1 World GP 2017 Japan Survival Wars 2017

{| class="wikitable" style="font-size: 80%;"
|-
! colspan="8" style="background-color: #ccf; color: #000080; text-align: center;" | Fight Card
|-
! colspan="1" style="background-color: #E6E8FA; color: #000000; text-align: center;" | Weight Class
! colspan="1" style="background-color: #E6E8FA; color: #000000; text-align: center;" | 
! colspan="1" style="background-color: #E6E8FA; color: #000000; text-align: center;" | 
! colspan="1" style="background-color: #E6E8FA; color: #000000; text-align: center;" | 
! colspan="1" style="background-color: #E6E8FA; color: #000000; text-align: center;" | Method
! colspan="1" style="background-color: #E6E8FA; color: #000000; text-align: center;" | Round  
! colspan="1" style="background-color: #E6E8FA; color: #000000; text-align: center;" | Time
! colspan="1" style="background-color: #E6E8FA; color: #000000; text-align: center;" | Notes
|-
|-
|Super Welterweight 70kg
| Hinata
|align=center|def.
| Yu Hirono
|Decision (Majority)
|align=center|3
|align=center|3:00
|
|-
|-
|Featherweight 57.5kg
| Tatsuya Tsubakihara
|align=center|def.
| Haruma Saikyo
|Decision (Majority)
|align=center|3
|align=center|3:00
|
|-
|-
|Super Bantamweight 55kg
| Taito Gunji
|align=center|def.
| Shota Oiwa
|Decision (Unanimous)
|align=center|3
|align=center|3:00
|
|-
|-
|Featherweight 57.5kg
| Yuta Murakoshi
|align=center|def.
| Ryusei Ashizawa
|Decision (Majority)
|align=center|3
|align=center|3:00
|
|-
|-
|Super Welterweight 70kg
| Hiromi Wajima
|align=center|def.
| Yoichi Yamazaki
|KO (Jumping Knee)
|align=center|3
|align=center|2:06
|
|-
|-
|Heavyweight 100kg
| Hitoshi Sugimoto
|align=center|def.
| RUI
|KO (Right Cross)
|align=center|2
|align=center|0:44
|
|-
|-
|Super Lightweight 65kg
| Yuto Shinohara
|align=center|def.
| Hayato Suzuki
|Decision (Split)
|align=center|3
|align=center|3:00
|
|-
|-
|Super Lightweight 65kg
| FUMIYA
|align=center|def.
| Masanobu
|KO (Right Cross)
|align=center|1
|align=center|1:11
|
|-
|-
|Lightweight 62.5kg
| Bazooka Koki
|align=center|def.
| Yuki Takeuchi
|KO (Left Hook)
|align=center|1
|align=center|0:34
|
|-

See also
 2017 in Glory 
 2017 in Kunlun Fight
 2017 in ONE Championship
 2017 in Romanian kickboxing
 2017 in Wu Lin Feng

References

External links
Official website

K-1 events
K-1
K-1